The Vicariate Apostolic of Orange River was a Roman Catholic missionary jurisdiction located in part of South Africa.

History 
The Apostolic vicariate was erected as such in 1897 after having been a prefecture Apostolic since 20 June 1885. It comprised the whole of Little Namaqualand (beginning on the northern line of Clan William County in Cape Colony, i. e. 30° 35′ S. lat.); extending to the Atlantic Ocean on the west and to the Orange River on the north. It further included Bushmanland, the districts of Kenhardt, Van Rhyns, Dorp and Frazerburg on the east, and beyond the Orange River the district of Gordonia in Bechuanaland.

The prefecture, detached from the vicariate in July, 1909, was bounded on the west by the Atlantic Ocean, extending from the Orange River as far as Damaraland (23° 20′ S. lat.), and comprises the city of Rehboth and its district. The eastern boundary line is 20° E. long.

On July 9, 1940, it was renamed as Apostolic Vicariate of Keimoes.

On January 11, 1951, it was promoted as Roman Catholic Diocese of Keimoes. On February 8, 1985, it was given its present name: Diocese of Keimoes – Upington.

The lands

Great Namaqualand
For thirty or forty, or in certain districts even a hundred miles inland, th Great Namaqualand district is only a sandy desert, which extends on the eastern side to the great Kalahari desert. The central portion depends for its fertility almost exclusively on thunder-storms, without which it would be nearly destitute of water. The vicariate is but little better in this respect. But when a sufficiently long rain waters these forlorn regions, the richest pastures spring up in an incredibly short time as the air becomes saturated to such a degree with the odour of vegetation that many suffer from headache. Swarms of locusts devour the exuberant produce, unless some powerful east wind carries them into the sea.

The "aristocracy" in Great Namaqualand consists of German immigrants, and in the other parts of the mission of English, Irish and Boer settlers, while the Hottentots form the bulk of the scanty population in the two Namaqualands. They are not negroes, their skin is like that of whites much browned by jaundice, and their build more like that of the Egyptians as seen on ancient monuments, or resembling the Chinese. Unselfish hospitality appears to be their natural virtue. They love music. Their habit of imitating is such as to rouse either a smile or exasperation; a crowd of Hottentots at Holy Mass, when receiving the priest's blessing, all repeated the sign of the Cross over him! The late Max Müller, nevertheless, vouched for their ancestors having been a cultured race. Although they have in their language a word signifying Deity, it took a long time to make them understand spiritual doctrines other than the existence of the devil. They are extremely disinclined to any form of labour or exertion. To induce them for example to navigate, the missionaries built a boat by which to cross the Orange River. For weeks, neither encouraging words nor exhibitions of safe sailing appeared to make any impression on them. One missionary relates that, among his hottentot catechumens, one never could learn how to make the sign of the Cross, nor the answers of the catechism, nor any prayer except these words of the Pater Nester: "Our Father, give us this day our daily bread". The missionaries have shown here what influence the Catholic Church exercises over the most forlorn nations, since the younger generation, trained by the missionaries as far as circumstances allowed, seemed considerably more intelligent and susceptible of culture than their elders.

Bushmanland
In this territory are found the Bushmen (or Bojesmen), a people kindred to the Hottentots; they are short in stature, and seemed to the early missionaries malicious and intractable.

Bechuanaland
The Bechuanas belong to the Kafir peoples. Many of them showed some skill in iron and copper working, mining and tanning hides. Many of them present a pleasing appearance, and some are handsome.

Missions
When the Oblates of St. Francis de Sales arrived in Little Namaqualand, to which the mission was then confined, they found not one hundred Catholics. In 1903, without any change of population, they counted 2735. There were six stations with churches and resident priests, five other stations regularly attended, 125 conversions during the year and 98 children baptized; 122 confirmations, 25 marriages; 3 hospitals and homes for the aged, 8 schools, 3 orphanages, 82 orphans, 8 missionary priests, 3 catechists; 15 missionary sisters aided the mission. Some fifty places were visited by the priests to attend to the spiritual and temporal wants of the people. In several places, all Catholic adults received Holy Communion on the first Friday of every month and the great feasts of the year.

Sella was the residence of the vicar Apostolic and Hierachalis that of the prefect Apostolic. These results were most encouraging, considering the great difficulties confronting the missionaries. In 1909 the approximate statistics for the two missions were: 1 bishop; 14 priests; 3 catechists; 22 missionary sisters; 480 children in Catholic schools; 175 baptisms of children, 315 baptisms of adults. In Little Namaqualand the natives understood Dutch (rather Afrikaans) or English; but in Great Namaqualand, besides German, the extremely difficult click language of the Hottentots had to be mastered.

Sources

Orange River
Roman Catholic dioceses in South Africa